Diego Rovira (born 27 March 1993) is an Argentine former footballer who is last known to have played as a midfielder for Shkumbini.

Career

Before the second half of 2013/14, Rovira signed for Albanian second division side Shkumbini.

References

External links
 

Argentine footballers
Living people
Association football midfielders
1993 births
Expatriate footballers in Albania
Argentine expatriate footballers
Kategoria e Parë players
KF Shkumbini players
Sportspeople from Mendoza Province